Wheat Hill is a mountain located in the Catskill Mountains of New York southwest of Franklin. Lawton Hill is located east, Hodges Hill is located south and Vandervort Hill is located west of Wheat Hill.

References

Mountains of Delaware County, New York
Mountains of New York (state)